Sighthill is a suburb in the west of Edinburgh, Scotland. The area is bordered by Broomhouse and Parkhead to the east, South Gyle to the north, the industrial suburb of Bankhead and the Calders neighbourhood to the west, and Wester Hailes to the south. It is sometimes included in the Wester Hailes area, while the Calders, Bankhead and Parkhead are sometimes considered parts of Sighthill. Administratively it has formed a core part of the City of Edinburgh Council's Sighthill/Gorgie ward since 2007.

New development

For nearly 50 years, the skyline of western Edinburgh was dominated by four high rise residential tower blocks in northern Sighthill (Broomview House, Glenalmond Court, Hermiston Court and Weir Court).

The 11-storey 'slab' block Broomview House was demolished on Sunday 21 September 2008 by Safedem.  The flats came down at 11:15am in a controlled explosion where a longstanding former resident pushed the ceremonial button to implode the building. The remaining three blocks were demolished on Sunday 25 September 2011, also at 11:15am. All of the remaining low-rise council-built properties in the vicinity were also demolished over the next few years. Plans for a new development called Broomview by Keepmoat were approved, and the area was successfully redeveloped, with construction work completed in 2020. To the north of this new housing is the area's public park.

The older, southern part of Sighthill consists mainly of cottage flat (four-in-a-block) homes, and has remained relatively unchanged since its construction in the late 1940s along with neighbouring Parkhead.

Amenities

Education
Edinburgh College (formerly Stevenson) and Edinburgh Napier University's Sighthill Campuses (formerly Stevenson College and the Edinburgh Business College respectively) are based here.

Healthcare, firefighting, retail and library services
There are a medical centre and a fire station. There are a public library and some shops. The Health centre was one of the first modern Health clinics in the UK (the other was in Cardiff) as a trial to see if it worked (before this, doctors made house visits to the patients' homes).

Transport
The Edinburgh–Dunblane line railway (also connecting to ) is nearby to the north, as is the route of Edinburgh Trams between the city centre and Edinburgh Airport. The Union Canal skirts the area to the south-west.

Lothian Buses provides 11 buses to the area:

3 Clovenstone - Wester Hailes - Sighthill - Gorgie - Haymarket - Princes Street - Newington - Gilmerton - Dalkeith -Mayfield
21 Clovenstone - Wester Hailes - Sighthill - Corstorphine - Clermiston - Ferry Road - Leith - Lochend - Portobello - Niddrie - Royal Infirmary
25 Heriot-Watt University  - Sighthill - Gorgie - Haymarket - Princes Street - Leith - Lochend - Restalrig
34 Heriot-Watt University - Sighthill - Longstone - Slateford - Fountainpark - Lothian Road - Princes Street - Lochend - Leith - Ocean Terminal
35 Heriot-Watt University - Sighthill - Slateford - Fountainpark - Bristo Square - Holyrood - Leith - Ocean Terminal
36 Gyle Centre - Sighthill - Longstone - Glenlockhart - Morningside - West End - Cannonmills - Bonnington - Leith - Ocean Terminal
X27 Regent Road - The Exchange - Balgreen - Sighthill - Hermiston - Wilkieston - Calderwood - East Calder - Livingston - Bathgate
X28 Regent Road - The Exchange - Balgreen - Sighthill - Hermiston - Kirknewton - East Calder - Livingston - Bathgate
Skylink 400 Edinburgh Airport - Gyle Centre - Sighthill - Wester Hailes - Colinton - Oxgangs - Fairmilehead - Gracemount - Gilmerton - Royal Infirmary - Niddrie - Fort Kinnaird
N25 Riccarton - Hermiston P&R - Sighthill - Gorgie - Haymarket - Leith Street
N28 Bathgate - Livingston - East Calder - Wilkieston - Hermiston - Sighthill - Balgreen - The Exchange - Leith Street

McGill's Scotland East provides 3 buses to the area

20: Chesser - Kingsknowe - Clovenstone - Wester Hailes - The Calders - Hermiston Gait - Gyle Centre - Ratho Station - Ratho

63: Balerno - Currie - Heriot-Watt University - Sighthill - Hermiston Gait - Gyle Centre - Ratho Station - Newbridge - Kirkliston - Queensferry

X22: Regent Road - Haymarket - Gorgie - Sighthill - Hermiston - East Calder - Livingston - Blackburn - Whitburn - Harthill - Shotts

Demographics

Film and television location
Sighthill has been used as a location for film and television productions. The most notable production to be filmed in Sighthill was the 1998 BBC Scotland television drama Looking After Jo Jo which featured Robert Carlyle in the title role and was filmed in and around North Sighthill and Niddrie. Other notable film and television productions to be filmed in Sighthill include Quite Ugly One Morning starring James Nesbitt and an adaptation of the Christopher Brookmyre novel and Trouble Sleeping - a tale of a Palestinian refugee struggling to survive in the UK. More recently the flats in Sighthill have been used as backdrop for the film Outcast a Celtic supernatural thriller once again starring James Nesbitt and released in 2010.

Notable residents
 Jamie Walker, footballer
 Scott McLaren, soldier from 4th Battalion the Royal Regiment of Scotland killed by the Taliban in July 2011

See also
Sighthill Stadium

References

External links
 Stevenson College
 Broomview House being demolished
 Contractor's demolition website, specific to Sighthill

Areas of Edinburgh
Housing estates in Edinburgh